Doomsday Brothers (original French-language title: Les Frères Apocalypse) is a Canadian adult animated sitcom. It premiered on the  block Télétoon la nuit in Télétoon on September 17, 2020, for its French version, and on Adult Swim on September 20, 2020, for its English version.

Cast
Raph Brûlé/Rafe Burns - Phil Roy (French), Josh Graham (English)
Gab Brûlé/Gabe Burns - Pier-Luc Funk (French), Robert Tinkler (English)
Judith Brûlé/Judith Burns - Guylaine Tremblay (French), Julie Lemieux (English)
Dave Bisson/Dwayne - Rémi-Pierre Paquin (French), Ron Pardo (English)
Vijay Ramcharan - Ali Badshah (English)
Danika Bisson/Danika - Sarah-Jeanne Labrosse (French), Ana Sani (English)
Ana Harvey - Rebecca Makonnen (French), Nicole Stamp (English)
Father Manilla - Julien Poulin (French), Cory Doran (English)
Suzette Ste-Croix/Suzette - Catherine-Anne Toupin (French), Stacey DePass (English)
Johnny - Cory Doran
AENUS - Benoit Rousseau (French), Ned Petrie (English)
Humunga - Nicole Stamp
Manson - Cory Doran
Johndoe - Ron Pardo
General Hecks - Josh Graham
Bryce - Robert Tinkler
Dr Sophia Ion

Episodes

References

External links
 
 Website
 Production website

2020 Canadian television series debuts
2021 Canadian television series endings
2020s Canadian adult animated television series
2020s Canadian animated comedy television series
2020s Canadian sitcoms
Canadian adult animated comedy television series
Canadian animated sitcoms
Canadian flash animated television series
English-language television shows
Teletoon original programming
Animated television series about brothers